Cidariplura ilana is a species of moth in the family Noctuidae. It was first found in Taiwan, and is one of a handful of species from this genus found in the island.

References

Hypeninae
Moths described in 2013